John Baker House may refer to:

John S. Baker House, Cincinnati, Ohio, listed on the National Register of Historic Places (NRHP)
John C. Baker House, Mechanicsburg, Ohio, NRHP-listed in Champaign County, Ohio

See also
Baker House (disambiguation)